José Alonso Valero (born 12 February 1957 in El Vendrell, Tarragona) is a retired Spanish hurdler, who specialized in the 400 metres hurdles. During the indoor season he competed over 400 metres, winning two medals at the 1985 and 1986 European Indoor Championships.

International competitions

References

1957 births
Living people
Spanish male hurdlers
Athletes (track and field) at the 1984 Summer Olympics
Athletes (track and field) at the 1988 Summer Olympics
Olympic athletes of Spain
Mediterranean Games gold medalists for Spain
Athletes (track and field) at the 1983 Mediterranean Games
Athletes (track and field) at the 1987 Mediterranean Games
Mediterranean Games medalists in athletics